Kathy Lynn Emerson is an American writer of historical and mystery novels and non-fiction. She also uses the pseudonyms Kaitlyn Dunnett and Kate Emerson.

Emerson writes historical mysteries as Kathy Lynn Emerson, historical fiction set in royal courts as Kate Emerson, and contemporary mystery books as Kaitlyn Dunnett. Her book How to Write Killer Historical Mysteries was nominated for two industry awards and won the 2008 Agatha Award for Best Non-Fiction.

Emerson was born and grew up in New York state. After graduating from Bates College in Lewiston, Maine, she continued for graduate school at Old Dominion University in Norfolk, Virginia. She also taught at Tidewater Community College in Virginia Beach, Virginia. She now lives on a Christmas tree farm in Wilton, Maine, with her husband and three cats.

Mysteries as Kaitlyn Dunnett
As Kaitlyn Dunnett, she writes the Liss MacCrimmon Mystery Series, published by Kensington Books. These are:
 Kilt Dead, novel originally published in 2007
 Scone Cold Dead, novel originally published in 2008
 A Wee Christmas Homicide, novel originally published in 2009
 The Corpse Wore Tartan, novel originally published in 2010
 Scotched, novel originally published in 2011
 Bagpipes, Brides, and Homicides, novel originally published in 2012
 Vampires, Bones, and Treacle Scones, novel originally published in 2013
 Ho-Ho-Homicide, novel originally published in 2014
 The Scottie Barked At Midnight,  novel originally published in 2015

Historical fiction as Kate Emerson
As Kate Emerson, she writes historical non-mystery fiction set in the 16th century. The Secrets of the Tudor Court series comprises:
 The Pleasure Palace, novel originally published in 2009
 Between Two Queens, novel originally published in 2010
 By Royal Decree, novel originally published in 2010
 At the King's Pleasure, novel originally published in 2012
 The King's Damsel, novel originally published in 2012

Historical mysteries as Kathy Lynn Emerson
She writes historical mysteries as Kathy Lynn Emerson.

The Face Down Mysteries feature Susanna, Lady Appleton, a 16th-century gentlewoman, herbalist, and sleuth. In chronological order, they are:
 “The Body in the Dovecote” (1552), short story
 “Much Ado About Murder” (1556), short story
 Face Down in the Marrow-Bone Pie (1559), novel originally published in 1997
 “The Rubaiyat of Nicholas Baldwin” (1559), short story
 Face Down Upon an Herbal (1561), novel originally published in 1998
 “Lady Appleton and the London Man” (1562), short story
 Face Down Among the Winchester Geese (1563), novel originally published in 1999
 “Lady Appleton and the Cautionary Herbal” (1564), short story
 Face Down Beneath the Eleanor Cross (1565), novel originally published in 2000
 Face Down Under the Wych Elm (1567), novel originally published in 2000
 Face Down Before Rebel Hooves (1569), novel originally published in 2001
 “The Riddle of the Woolsack” (1569), short story
 Face Down Across the Western Sea (1571), novel originally published in 2002
 “Lady Appleton and the Cripplegate Chrisoms” (1572), short story
 “Lady Appleton and the Bristol Crystals” (1572), short story
 Face Down Below the Banqueting House (1573), novel originally published in 2005
 Face Down Beside St. Anne's Well (1575), novel originally published in 2006
 “Encore for a Neck Verse” (1576), short story
 “Confusions Most Monstrous” (1577), short story
 “Death by Devil's Turnips” (1577), short story
 Face Down O’er the Border (1577), novel originally published 2007
 “Any Means Short of Murder” (1579), short story
 “A Wondrous Violent Motion” (1580), short story, published in December 2013 Alfred Hitchcock’s Mystery Magazine
 “The Curse of the Figure Flinger” (1585), short story
 “Lady Appleton and the Yuletide Hogglers” (1586), short story
 Murders and Other Confusions: The Chronicles of Susanna, Lady Appleton, Gentlewoman, Herbalist, and Sleuth, anthology of short stories, published by Crippen & Landru, 2004
 Crimes and Confusions, anthology of short stories, published in 2010

The Diana Spaulding 1888 Mysteries or Diana Spaulding 1888 Quartet feature a journalist from late 19th-century America. In chronological order, they are:
 Deadlier than the Pen (set in March 1888), novel originally published in 2004
 “The Kenduskeag Killer” (set in early April 1888), short story
 “The Telltale Twinkle” (set in early April 1888), short story
 Fatal as a Fallen Woman (set in April 1888), novel originally published in 2005
 No Mortal Reason (set in May 1888), novel originally published in 2007
 Lethal Legend (set in June 1888), novel originally published in 2008
 Crimes and Confusions, anthology of short stories

Other titles as Kathy Lynn Emerson
Emerson has written a number of other fiction titles. These include:
 4 books for young readers aged 8–12, originally published from 1985 to 1991
 14 romance novels, originally published in 1990s, that are currently out of print
 Someday, a romantic suspense novel for young adults, originally published in 2001
 Shalla, an American colonial-era historical novel for young readers, originally published in 2010

She also has three book-length nonfiction titles:
 Wives and Daughters: The Women of Sixteenth Century England, originally published in 1984; replaced by the revised and enlarged A Who's Who of Tudor Women
 The Writer’s Guide to Everyday Life in Renaissance England, originally published in 1996
 How to Write Killer Historical Mysteries: The Art and Adventure of Sleuthing Through the Past, originally published in 2008

Awards
 Winner of the 2008 Agatha Award for Best Non-Fiction: How to Write Killer Historical Mysteries
 Nominated for the 2009 Anthony Award for Best Critical Non-fiction Work: How to Write Killer Historical Mysteries

References

External links
Kathy Lynn Emerson website
Kaitlyn Dunnett website
Kate Emerson website

21st-century American novelists
21st-century American women writers
Agatha Award winners
American historical novelists
American mystery writers
American women novelists
Novelists from Maine
Novelists from New York (state)
Year of birth missing (living people)
Living people
Women mystery writers
People from Wilton, Maine
Women historical novelists